Hong Xuezhi (February 2, 1913 – November 20, 2006) was a general in the Chinese Red Army and a politician in the People's Republic of China. He was the only person awarded the rank of 3-star general in 1955 who was reawarded the same rank in 1988 as an active PLA officer when the PLA readopted a rank system.

Biography
Hong was born in Jinzhai county, Anhui. In 1929 Hong joined the Chinese Communist Party. He survived and gained promotions during Chiang Kai-shek's Encirclement Campaigns during the early Chinese Civil War. In 1935, Hong joined the Long March with the New Fourth Army. During the Second Sino-Japanese War, Huang joined the Hundred Regiments Offensive.

During the Korean War, Hong was the deputy commander and director of logistics of the People's Volunteer Army. He participated in the armistice negotiations that ended the Korean War in 1953. In 1955, he was promoted to the rank of Colonel General (Shang Jiang). Hong was removed from his position in 1959 for his connections with marshal Peng Dehuai, who was dismissed from office for criticizing Mao Zedong’s economic policies during the Great Leap Forward. He was rehabilitated in the early 1960s, but was persecuted by Red Guards during the Cultural Revolution.

After the Deng Xiaoping came to power in the late 1970s, Hong was rehabilitated. He joined the Central Military Commission and became the vice chairman of the 7th and 8th Chinese People's Political Consultative Conference National Committees. In 1988 when ranks were readopted by the PLA, Hong became the only 1955 Shang Jiang to be reawarded the same rank. Thus, he earned the nickname of Six-Star General. In 1989, Hong retired from the position of the deputy secretary-general of the Central Military Commission.

Hong married Zhang Wen. They had three sons and five daughters, including Hong Hu, the Governor of the Jilin between 1999 and 2004.

References 

 Leaders bid farewell to General Hong Xuezhi

People's Liberation Army generals from Anhui
Victims of the Cultural Revolution
1913 births
2006 deaths
Chinese Communist Party politicians from Anhui
People's Republic of China politicians from Anhui
People from Jinzhai County
People's Liberation Army General Logistics Department
Politicians from Lu'an
Vice Chairpersons of the National Committee of the Chinese People's Political Consultative Conference
Burials at Babaoshan Revolutionary Cemetery